The Intrepid RAS-12/AR-12 is a semi auto shotgun derived from the AR-10 platform and manufactured by Intrepid Tactical Solutions. The weapon is chambered in a proprietary rimless 12 gauge round.

The original RAS-12 working prototypes and intellectual property were developed from July 2011 to July 2012 in Hayden, Idaho by Erik DeJong and Teodor Puha of North Idaho Tech, Inc..

In July 2012 a group of investors formed Intrepid Tactical Solutions and acquired the assets of NIT, while retaining DeJong and Puha in engineering and production roles.

The RAS-12 gun and ammunition were introduced to the firearms industry at the SHOT Show in Las Vegas in January of 2013.

Intrepid Tactical Solutions ceased operations in September of 2014.

References

Semi-automatic shotguns of the United States